The Co-Captains are an American production team, consisting of Jovan J. Dawkins, Jevon Hill and Stanley Green Jr. They have produced songs for Travis Barker ("Sixteen"), Mario ("Music for Love") and Nelly ("U Know U Want To"). One of their most notable productions was for Ciara and Nicki Minaj's 2013 song "I'm Out", which debuted at No. 44 on the Billboard charts. The Co-Captains, who have also produced for Omarion and season 12 American Idol winner Candice Glover, credit part of their musical style and influences to Teddy Riley, Timbaland and Phil Collins. Dawkins is also the founder of Heritage Music Group, which earned five Grammy wins in 2018. Among those awards were R&B Album of The Year (Bruno Mars, 24K Magic), Song of The Year (Bruno Mars, "That's What I Like"), and Best R&B Song of The Year (Bruno Mars, "That's What I Like").

Production credits

Single credits

References

External links 

American record producers
Record production teams